Pickhill Halt railway station was a station in Sesswick, Wrexham, Wales. The station was opened on 30 May 1938 and closed in 1962.

The opening of the halt coincided with the building of a milk factory by Cadbury Brothers, who bought the greenfield site at auction from Mrs Randles, the 92-year old owner of the Brynafon Estate, in March 1937. The station was a single platform of wooden construction, and immediately south of the station under the adjacent road bridge was the gated siding into the factory. After the closure of the railway to passengers the line from Wrexham to Pickhill remained in use for the milk trains, while the line south of the siding was lifted. Although in 1971 the milk factory (known as Maelor Creamery) moved away from rail transport, it continued under various owners until it closed in March 2014.

References

Further reading

Disused railway stations in Wrexham County Borough
Former Great Western Railway stations
Railway stations in Great Britain opened in 1938
Railway stations in Great Britain closed in 1940
Railway stations in Great Britain opened in 1946
Railway stations in Great Britain closed in 1962
1938 establishments in England
1962 disestablishments in England